The women's flyweight (51 kilograms) event at the 2018 Asian Games took place from 24 August to 1 September 2018 at Jakarta International Expo Hall, Jakarta, Indonesia.

In the final, Chinese boxer Chang defeated North Korean boxer Pang by a split decision of 3–2. Pang was the more aggressive boxer throughout the bout and the verdict came as a shock to the Korean side. They protested inside the ring. Eventually the security personnels were required to remove them from the ring. Many of the spectators also thought Pang was the clear winner, so they booed the verdict and the boos continued even during the medal distribution ceremony. North Korea challenged the verdict. Though the verdict was not overturned, AIBA restored the right to challenge a verdict of the boxing bouts in future amateur boxing tournaments.

Schedule
All times are Western Indonesia Time (UTC+07:00)

Results 
Legend
RSC — Won by referee stop contest

Final

Top half

Bottom half

References

External links
Official website

Boxing at the 2018 Asian Games